London & South Eastern Railway Limited, trading as Southeastern, was a British train operating company owned by Govia that operated passenger rail services in South East England. It was the key operator of commuter and regional services in South East London and Kent, and also served parts of East Sussex.

Southeastern trains operated on three main routes: the South Eastern Main Line from London Cannon Street and London Charing Cross to Dover via Sevenoaks; the Chatham Main Line between London Victoria and Dover/Ramsgate via the Medway towns; and High Speed 1 from London St Pancras.

Southeastern began operations on 1 April 2006 as the franchisee for the new Integrated Kent franchise (IKF), replacing the publicly owned South Eastern Trains on the former South Eastern franchise. Southeastern received a number of extensions, with the franchise scheduled to end on 1 April 2020, until a new contract was agreed on 30 March 2020, running for up to two years. The Southeastern franchise was terminated early on 16 October 2021 and transferred to the Department for Transport-owned operator SE Trains, which is also trading as Southeastern, after an investigation into £25million of unaccounted for taxpayer money.

Overview 
Southeastern served the main London stations of Charing Cross, Victoria, Cannon Street, London Bridge, Waterloo East and St Pancras. The Southeastern network has a route mileage of 540, with 179 stations. About 70% of its services run to and from London.

It was owned by Govia, a joint venture between Go-Ahead Group and Keolis, which also operates the neighbouring Southern franchise that overlapped with Southeastern in some western areas.

History 

In December 2003, the Strategic Rail Authority announced that Danish State Railways/Stagecoach, FirstGroup, Govia and MTR/Sea Containers had been shortlisted to bid for the new Integrated Kent franchise, which would replace the South Eastern franchise and include services on High Speed 1 operating from St Pancras. In November 2005, the Department for Transport (DfT) announced Govia had been awarded the franchise; the services operated by South Eastern Trains transferred to Southeastern on 1 April 2006.

The franchise was let for an initial eight years, with a two-year option dependent on performance targets being met. The opening of the second phase of High Speed 1 in November 2007 made available train paths on the traditional network previously used by Eurostar, allowing Southeastern to increase certain services in December 2007. In December 2008, as part of the franchise agreement, responsibility for the Redhill to Tonbridge Line passed to Southern. Southeastern high-speed services began full operations on 14 December 2009. Having met the performance criteria, in March 2011 the DfT granted Govia a two-year franchise extension until March 2014.

Following the DfT's review after the cancellation of the InterCity West Coast franchise process, extensions were granted to the franchises due for renewal, and Southeastern's franchise was extended until June 2018. It was later extended until December 2018.

In March 2009, the bay platforms at London Blackfriars closed for reconstruction as part of the Thameslink Programme. Southeastern services previously terminating at Blackfriars, mostly from  via the Catford loop, were extended to Kentish Town, St Albans, Luton or Bedford.
When the station fully reopened with new bay platforms in May 2012, these services continued to run, but in the evening and at weekends (when the station had been closed), instead of terminating at Victoria, services now terminate at Blackfriars.

Following the DfT review after the cancellation of the InterCity West Coast franchise process, extensions were granted to the franchises due for renewal in the near future. In 2013, the coalition government extended Southeastern's franchise, without competitive tender, from March 2014 to June 2018, and in 2016 further extended it until December 2018. The Invitation to Tender, detailing the improvements that must be made by the new franchisee, were be released in September 2017 for contract award in August 2018.

Amidst a background of ongoing rail strikes nationwide, in September 2017, Southeastern cleaning staff, outsourced to employment agency Wettons, voted to stage industrial action in a dispute over pay and working conditions. The first strike by RMT-affiliated Wettons cleaning staff at Southeastern took place for 24 hours starting at 20:30 on 19 October 2017. There was no further industrial action, although negotiations between the RMT, Southeastern and Wettons remained ongoing.

These services using the Class 700 now run from  through the London Core via  and on to the Kent Main Line or the North Kent Line.

Development of future franchise 

In January 2016, Transport for London announced its intention to take over the London suburban parts of the franchise from 2018, integrating the routes into a proposed metro network. However, in December 2016, Transport Secretary Chris Grayling rejected this plan.

In June 2017, the Department for Transport announced an Abellio/East Japan Railway Company/Mitsui consortium, incumbent Govia, Stagecoach and Trenitalia had been shortlisted to bid for the next South Eastern franchise. On 10 August 2017, Trenitalia withdrew its interest in the franchise. Alstom joined Stagecoach's bid in February 2018.

The Invitation to Tender for the next franchise was issued in November 2017. There have been several extensions to the current franchise since then. The franchise competition was cancelled on 7 August 2019 and the DfT instead took up a further extension and the operator was to run services until 31 March 2020. However, a new contract was then agreed on 30 March 2020, running up to 16 October 2021, with a possible extension to 31 March 2022.

Termination of franchise 
In September 2021, the Department for Transport (DfT) announced it would be terminating the South Eastern franchise operated by Govia-owned Southeastern after revenue declaration discrepancies involving £25million of public money were discovered. Secretary of State for Transport Grant Shapps stated that this was a serious breach of the "good faith" obligation in the franchise agreement.

Following the announcement, shares in Go-Ahead Group (joint owner of Govia) fell 22% and their Chief Financial Officer resigned. Go-Ahead subsequently admitted to "serious errors and failures" in December 2021, with trading of its shares on the London Stock Exchange suspended as it was unable to publish financial results.

In February 2022, Go-Ahead announced the outcome of investigations into the termination of the franchise. It found that "serious errors had been made” since 2006, with the expected cost to the company to be over £80million. The amount owed to the DfT was increased to £51.3million, with errors dating back to the start of the franchise in 2006. Go-Ahead also stated that they expect to have to pay a fine to the DfT, setting aside up to £30million for this. Go-Ahead also stated that they may also owe DfT an additional £21.3million, related to a dispute over profit sharing.

In March 2022, the government imposed a £23.5million penalty in addition the £64million that it is seeking to recover from the former operator.

Southeastern (SE Trains Limited), as an operator of last resort, took over the franchise on 17 October 2021.

Southeastern sub-brands

Highspeed 
High-speed trains use High Speed 1 calling at Stratford International and Ebbsfleet International. Trains from London to the Medway towns and Faversham leave the high-speed line at Ebbsfleet and continue via the North Kent line and Chatham Main Line. Trains for Dover Priory and Margate leave the high-speed line at Ashford International. A limited peak-hour service now also operates between St Pancras and Maidstone West via Ebbsfleet and Strood.

When bidding for the franchise, Southeastern made a point of advertising part-owner SNCF's experience operating integrated high-speed train services on the French TGV network. A fleet of 29 six-coach Shinkansen-derived high-speed 'A-trains' were built in Japan by Hitachi for this route. The colour scheme for the high-speed trains' livery was dark blue. The services were marketed as Southeastern Highspeed, and some of the trains were named after British Olympians such as Steve Redgrave and Ben Ainslie.

At the same time, there was the largest change to the timetable in the area in 40 years. With the fast trains now travelling over High Speed 1, the Charing Cross to Ashford stopping service was extended to Dover, Canterbury and Ramsgate.

Fares for journeys that included the High Speed 1 section of line (between St Pancras International and Gravesend) generally included a surcharge.

Javelin shuttle 

Southeastern operated special high speed services using the Class 395 during the 2012 Summer Olympics and Paralympics, branded as the Olympic Javelin or Javelin. As a result, the class is still sometimes referred to as the Javelin.

Announced as part of the successful London 2012 Olympic bid, it was an integral part of a plan to improve public transport in London in readiness for the Olympics, an area of the bid that was initially regarded as being poor by the International Olympic Committee (IOC). The British Olympic Association applied to register Javelin as a UK trademark on 19 July 2005 and this was granted on 2 June 2006.

The service ran for the duration of both games, between St Pancras International station and Ebbsfleet International station, via Stratford International station, which is close to the Olympic Park. Eight trains per hour ran between St Pancras and Ebbsfleet, calling at Stratford, replacing the usual East Kent highspeed service. Two of these were extended to Ashford and one to Faversham. Between 11pm and 1am the service between St Pancras and Ebbsfleet was increased to twelve per hour.

At St Pancras, there is an interchange with the London Underground and with trains to/from the Midlands, Scotland, and the North of England. For track capacity reasons, Eurostar trains, which have never called at Stratford, did not do so during the games. It was expected that over 80% of Olympic spectators would travel to and from the venues by rail. Services to the Olympic Park were planned to offer a total capacity of 240,000 travellers per hour, some 25,000 of whom were expected to use the Javelin service.

Mainline 
Southeastern was the key operator for Kent, and also serves East Sussex. 'Mainline' services connect central London with Dover, Folkestone, Hastings, Royal Tunbridge Wells, Ramsgate, Chatham, Maidstone and Canterbury. The backbone fleet on these services is the  Electrostar, although   Electrostars and /9 Networkers are also used on some routes.

In December 2009, Southeastern saw 'Highspeed' trains stopping at 'Mainline' stations, and some longer timings on 'Mainline' services as trains called at more stations. Services to Tonbridge were maintained at six trains per hour off-peak, two per hour going forward to Ashford and beyond, two per hour to Hastings, and two per hour terminating at Tunbridge Wells. With high-speed services reaching Faversham, the half-hourly Victoria to Faversham stopping service was replaced with an hourly service to Gillingham and additional stops on the "fast" services to London Victoria. On the Maidstone East Line, services from London Cannon Street to  via  and from London Victoria to Maidstone East and to  via Ashford were replaced by a half-hourly Victoria to Ashford service. The Sittingbourne to Sheerness on Sea branch line also comes under 'Mainline' services, using  Electrostars which replaced  Networkers. Mainline services use a dark blue livery, similar to that of the "Javelin" high-speed trains.

Metro 
The livery for these was white with the Southeastern logo, which was also formerly used for "Mainline" services.

Routes 
As of September 2021, the weekday off-peak service pattern, with frequencies in trains per hour (tph), was:

Ticketing 

Performance 

In late 2010, the company faced a barrage of criticism for its performance during extreme weather conditions in the south-east of England and there are also allegations that Southeastern deliberately runs reduced services to skew its official performance figures.

In 2014, a survey of UK rail passenger satisfaction showed Southeastern to be the lowest-rated train operating company, with just forty per cent of passengers believing that good service is provided and a rating of only one out of five for value for money. Southeastern claimed that the reason for this is that people dislike going to work and that if the survey were to be retaken on a "sunny summer's day" the outcome would be better for the company.

In a survey (Best and worst UK train companies) carried out in February 2015 by Which? magazine, Southeastern continued to rank poorly, rated as the second-worst UK train operating train companies customer score of just 44%. This was narrowly ahead of Govia Thameslink Railway, with 43%. Southeastern also achieved only 2/5 or 3/5 star ratings across the six specific categories assessed in the survey (such categories included Punctuality, Reliability and Cleanliness of toilets).

Southeastern performed poorly in performance and passenger satisfaction in 2016, with the 2016 survey by Which? magazine finding Southeastern to be the joint-worst performing train operating company in Britain, with a customer score of just 46%. The Spring 2016 National Rail Passenger Survey further underlined Southeastern's continuing poor performance and passenger satisfaction. The company issued a joint response with Network Rail on the day of publication, primarily blaming outside factors and survey methodology. The 2016 Which? figures were backed up by the 2016 Transport Focus survey, which placed Southeastern joint bottom in satisfaction on service delivery.
Satisfaction with the frequency of services declined year on year from 73% to 56%, and satisfaction with ticket value scored 30%, the lowest of any operator in the country.

In the Autumn 2019 National Rail Passenger Survey, 81% of passengers using Southeastern services were satisfied with their journeys. This was the company's highest score for six years and an increase of 3% on the previous year.

Rolling stock 
Southeastern operated a fleet of approximately 400 trains, all of which are electric multiple units and have been taken over by its successor Southeastern.

Fleet at end of franchise

Past fleet 
The transfer of some routes to Southern and Thameslink allowed Southeastern to withdraw its small fleet of Class 508 EMUs and replace them with Networker stock cascaded from other services.

Driver depots 
Southeastern's drivers were based at the following locations;

References

External links 

 Company website (archived)
 alwaystouchout.com on the Channel Tunnel Rail Link (includes information about the high speed services)

|-

Go-Ahead Group companies
High-speed rail in the United Kingdom
Keolis
Railway companies established in 2006
Railway companies disestablished in 2021
Railway operators in London
Defunct train operating companies
2006 establishments in England
2021 disestablishments in England